El Carrizo Reservoir Spanish: Presa (El) Carrizo is a reservoir located in Baja California, south the town of Tecate. The dam is called El Carrizo, and it supplies 95% of the drinking water for Tijuana and Rosarito Beach. It is managed by CONAGUA.

References

Reservoirs in Mexico
Landforms of Baja California